Lindeman Fjord is a fjord in King Christian X Land, East Greenland. Administratively it is part of the Northeast Greenland National Park zone.

History
The outer part of the fjord was first surveyed by Carl Koldewey during the 1869–70 Second German North Polar Expedition. Koldewey named it Lindeman Bai  after Moritz Karl Adolf Lindeman (1823 – 1908), secretary of the Association for German Polar Exploration (Verein für die Deutsche Nordpolarfahrt) in Bremen. 

Later, during the 1929–1930 Expedition to East Greenland led by Lauge Koch, more thorough surveys were made and the fjord was found to become narrow to the west and extend further inland, thus the water body was renamed "Lindeman Fjord".

Geography
Lindeman Fjord opens to the east, southwest of Kuhn Island and south of the mouth area of Fligely Fjord. It extends southwest of Kuhn Island, west of Cape Schumacher at the southern end of the island. To the south lies A. P. Olsen Land and Thomas Thomsen Land lies to the north.

A massive mountain named Hohe Kugel rises north of the mouth of the fjord. Svejstrup Dal, a long valley at the head of Lindemann Fjord, stretches northwestwards between A. P. Olsen Land and Thomas Thomsen Land

See also
List of fjords of Greenland

References

External links
 Scott Polar Research Institute, Cambridge - Museum catalogue
 Field report from Greenland: basin analysis in high gear

Fjords of Greenland